Quanah Parker Lake is a reservoir located in Comanche County, Oklahoma, and is part of the Wichita Mountains Wildlife Refuge. It was built on Quanah Creek during the 1930s as a Federal Work Project during the Great Depression, and is named for the last chief of the Quahadi Comanche tribe.

See also
 Quanah Parker

References

Reservoirs in Oklahoma
Bodies of water of Comanche County, Oklahoma
1930s establishments in Oklahoma